CFWH-TV was the television call sign for the CBC's television station in Whitehorse, Yukon. Commencing transmissions on November 26, 1968, it was one of ultimately six Frontier Coverage Package stations in the Yukon; satellite delivery of colour television began on February 5, 1973. It was a part of the CBC North television system.

Prior to the launch of CFWH-TV and for several years thereafter, Whitehorse's WHTV cable TV system (now part of Northwestel Cable) carried a mix of prerecorded CBC, CTV and syndicated programs on Channel 4 on its system, offered up to two weeks after their initial broadcasts on stations in southern Canada.

History
During its life, CFWH-TV was always licensed as a repeater. For most of its existence, this station was part of a "radiocommunication distribution undertaking" that included CFYK-TV in Yellowknife and CFFB-TV in Iqaluit. The CRTC did not license it as a television station, but merely as a transmitter to redistribute CBC North. In 2011, CFYK-TV was licensed as a full television station, with CFWH and CFFB as repeaters.

CFWH-TV was licensed as a rebroadcaster of CFYK-TV, even though it operated as a semi-satellite with its own network of rebroadcasters. As a result, CFWH-TV and its network of rebroadcasters was one of many CBC and Radio-Canada's remaining analogue transmitters closed on July 31, 2012, as part of several austerity measures announced in April 2012 to keep the corporation solvent and in operation. As a result, this leaves almost the entirety of the Yukon without any aerial CBC television service, the only exception being a community owned broadcaster in Upper Liard, CH2986 channel 9. However, few viewers in the Yukon actually lost access to CBC programming due to the extremely high penetration of cable and satellite.

CFYK still operates a Yukon bureau at the CBC's studio in Whitehorse.

Transmitters
CFWH-TV had five over the air VHF analog rebroadcasters throughout the territory of Yukon before they were decommissioned on July 31, 2012.

See also
CBC North

References

External links
CBC North
 

Fwh
Fwh
Television channels and stations established in 1968
Mass media in Whitehorse
Television channels and stations disestablished in 2012
FWH-TV